Gonatopodinae are a subfamily of Dryinidae with wingless, ant-like females, but winged males. Females have a chela on each front leg. There are 17 genera, including Gonatopus.

References

External links 

Apocrita subfamilies
Dryinidae